"Be Young, Be Foolish, Be Happy" is a soul song. It was first recorded in 1967 by the Sensational Epics and was originally released on Warner Bros. Records. The song has also been recorded by the Tams, Sonia, and others.

The Tams version
The Tams' version was released as a single in 1968, in the US, and was a moderate success, peaking at  26 on the R&B singles chart and No. 61 on the Hot 100. Sometime later, in March 1970, it peaked at No. 32 on the UK Singles Chart. It has since become one of the most popular beach music songs, especially in the American South, where the song and the group enjoy continued popularity and recognizability, as do all of the hits by the group. The song is also still popular in the United Kingdom amongst fans of Northern soul.  Noddy Holder, lead singer with 70s British Glam rock band Slade, claimed in a newspaper interview that his band was playing the song live long before its Northern Soul success.

Charts

Sonia version

Sonia's version of the song was produced by Nigel Wright for her second, self-titled studio album. The song was released in August 1991 as the album's second single, with another album track "Used to Be My Love" on the B-side. The song reached No. 22 on the UK Singles Chart.

In 1992, the track was released as the lead single off the album in the US, with a different single mix than in the UK. It peaked at No. 13 on  Billboards Adult Contemporary chart.

Formats and track listingsCD single "Be Young, Be Foolish, Be Happy" – 2:55
 "Be Young, Be Foolish, Be Happy" (extended mix) – 4:54
 "Used to Be My Love" – 3:477-inch single "Be Young, Be Foolish, Be Happy" – 2:55
 "Used to Be My Love" – 3:47US 7-inch single "Be Young, Be Foolish, Be Happy" (Beach mix) – 3:18
 "Used to Be My Love" – 3:4712-inch single'
 "Be Young, Be Foolish, Be Happy" (extended mix) – 4:54
 "Used to Be My Love" – 3:47

Charts

References

Sources
 

1968 singles
1968 songs
1991 singles
ABC Records singles
Songs written by J. R. Cobb
Songs written by Ray Whitley (songwriter)
Sonia (singer) songs